Sinfonico II (Symphonic II) (2001) is the eighteenth album and first compilation album by Mexican rock and blues band El Tri. Is the second one to contain (as the name implies) collaboration of a symphonic orchestra.

Track listing 
All tracks by Alex Lora except where noted.

 "San Juanico" – 5:52 (Simplemente, 1984)
 "El Blues de la Llanta" (The Blues of The Tire) (Lora, Sergio Mancera) – 5:56 (Qué Rico Diablo, 1977)
 "Oye Cantinero" (Hey, Bartender) – 5:41 (Three Souls in My Mind III, 1972)
 "Perdedor" (Loser) – 4:43 (Una Rola Para Los Minusvalidos, 1994)
 "Nunca Digas Que No" (Never Say No) – 4:42 (Hecho en México, 1985)
 "Ya Estamos Hartos" (We Are Tired Of It) – 3:40 (Lora, Su Lira y Sus Rolas, 1999)
 "Millones de Niños" (Millions of Children) – 9:15 (Una Leyenda Viva Llamada El Tri, 1990)
 "Todo Me Sale Mal" (Everything I Do Go Wrong) – 3:12 (Fin de Siglo, 1998)
 "Parece Fácil" (It Looks Easy) – 6:55 (Cuando Tú No Estás, 1997)
 "Esclavo del Rocanrol" (Slave of Rock`n Roll) (Rodrigo Levario, Lora) – 3:17 (Cuando Tú No Estás, 1997)
 "Negro Como Tu Conciencia" (Black As Your Conscience) – 3:46 (25 Años, 1993)
 "Amnesia" – 4:03 (La Devaluacion, 1975)
 "La Raza Más Chida" (The Coolest Race) – 4:22 (Una Rola Para los Minusvalidos, 1994)

Album and year of original release inside parenthesis

Personnel

Musicians
 Alex Lora – guitar, bass, vocals, producer, mixing
 Rafael Salgado – harmonic
 Eduardo Chico – guitar
 Oscar Zarate – guitar
 Chela Lora – backing vocals, art direction
 Ramon Perez – drums

Guest musicians 
 Benjamin Alarcón – trombone
 Gabriel Perez Cruz – trombone
 Barbara Klessa Novak – violin
 Lalo Toral – piano, arranger

Technical
Patricia Abdelnour – assistant engineer
Alberto Núñez – arranger
Felipe Souza – arranger
Mark Chalecki – mastering
Pablo Munguia – engineer, mixing, supervisor
Sergio Rivero – photography
Jean B. Smit – engineer, mastering, recorder
Humberto Terán – engineer
Eugenio Toussaint – arranger

External links 
www.eltri.com.mx
Sinfonico II at MusicBrainz
[ Sinfonico II] at AllMusic

El Tri albums
2001 compilation albums
Warner Music Group compilation albums